Springfield  is a suburb of Rotorua in the Bay of Plenty Region of New Zealand's North Island.

Springfield Golf Club started in 1947 and developed the course in Springfield from 1948.

Demographics

Springfield had a population of 3,780 at the 2018 New Zealand census, an increase of 231 people (6.5%) since the 2013 census, and an increase of 78 people (2.1%) since the 2006 census. There were 1,323 households, comprising 1,797 males and 1,980 females, giving a sex ratio of 0.91 males per female, with 714 people (18.9%) aged under 15 years, 573 (15.2%) aged 15 to 29, 1,680 (44.4%) aged 30 to 64, and 810 (21.4%) aged 65 or older.

Ethnicities were 78.8% European/Pākehā, 20.6% Māori, 2.5% Pacific peoples, 10.9% Asian, and 2.1% other ethnicities. People may identify with more than one ethnicity.

The percentage of people born overseas was 24.0, compared with 27.1% nationally.

Although some people chose not to answer the census's question about religious affiliation, 50.2% had no religion, 37.2% were Christian, 0.8% had Māori religious beliefs, 1.9% were Hindu, 0.4% were Muslim, 0.8% were Buddhist and 2.1% had other religions.

Of those at least 15 years old, 798 (26.0%) people had a bachelor's or higher degree, and 420 (13.7%) people had no formal qualifications. 606 people (19.8%) earned over $70,000 compared to 17.2% nationally. The employment status of those at least 15 was that 1,491 (48.6%) people were employed full-time, 471 (15.4%) were part-time, and 93 (3.0%) were unemployed.

Education

References

Suburbs of Rotorua
Populated places in the Bay of Plenty Region